Addressee may refer to:

 Someone to whom mail or similar things are addressed or sent
 Interlocutor (linguistics), a person to whom a conversation or dialogue is addressed

See also
 Address (disambiguation)
 Addressee honorific, linguistic means to express the social status of the person being spoken to
 Clusivity, means of distinguishing who a pronoun addresses or refers to